The 2007 Chinese Grand Prix (officially the 2007 Formula 1 Sinopec Chinese Grand Prix) was the sixteenth race of the 2007 FIA Formula One World Championship. It was held on 7 October 2007 at Shanghai International Circuit, Shanghai, China. The race was won by Ferrari's Kimi Räikkönen with Fernando Alonso finishing second and Felipe Massa finishing third. Championship leader Lewis Hamilton retired from the race after going off at a wet pit entrance on worn tyres left him stuck in the gravel. Räikkönen's win marked the 200th Grand Prix victory for Scuderia Ferrari.

Report

Background
Going into the race, Lewis Hamilton of McLaren led the Drivers' Championship by 12 points from his team-mate Fernando Alonso, after Alonso crashed in Fuji Speedway. Ferrari's Kimi Räikkönen was the other driver who mathematically had a chance of winning the championship, trailing Hamilton by 17 points. To clinch the championship, Hamilton needed to finish within one point of his team-mate Alonso and within 6 points of Räikkönen. Whatever the result, Hamilton would still be leading the championship after the race.

The weather conditions at the track were affected by Typhoon Krosa which hit the east coast of China.

Qualifying
Sebastian Vettel was facing a drop of ten places on the grid for his collision with Mark Webber in the previous race (the Japanese Grand Prix), but this punishment was reduced to a reprimand. However, the Toro Rosso driver was then dropped five places on the grid for impeding Heikki Kovalainen during qualifying.

The Spykers of Adrian Sutil and Sakon Yamamoto were both eliminated in the first qualifying session, along with Takuma Sato in the Super Aguri, Alexander Wurz in his final race for Williams, Giancarlo Fisichella in the Renault and Rubens Barrichello in the Honda. However, Vettel's penalty caused him to be relegated behind Barrichello. In the second session, Nico Rosberg in the second Williams, Anthony Davidson in the Super Aguri, Heikki Kovalainen in the Renault, Jarno Trulli in the Toyota and the two Toro Rossos of Vettel and Vitantonio Liuzzi were eliminated.

The final session saw Jenson Button come 10th in a rare top ten qualification. The two BMW Saubers were 8th and 9th, with Nick Heidfeld ahead of Robert Kubica. The Red Bulls of David Coulthard and Mark Webber did very well, qualifying 5th and 7th respectively. They were separated by Ralf Schumacher's Toyota. As usual in the 2007 season, the Ferraris and McLarens occupied the top 4 spots in qualifying, with the Italian team's Felipe Massa pipping McLaren's Fernando Alonso, to third place.

Although Kimi Räikkönen of Ferrari had been the fastest driver in all three practice sessions and in the first two sessions of qualifying, Lewis Hamilton managed to beat this time in his McLaren during the third qualifying session and therefore earned the pole position, the 6th of his career.

Race

From the morning of the race onwards, conditions at the circuit were wet; this forced all drivers to use intermediate tyres. After the start of the race, the top four remained the same as on the grid with Lewis Hamilton leading in the McLaren from Kimi Räikkönen in the Ferrari, his teammate Felipe Massa and the other McLaren of Fernando Alonso. Vitantonio Liuzzi was the biggest winner from the start in his Toro Rosso, passing Jenson Button's Honda, Robert Kubica in the BMW Sauber and the Red Bull of Mark Webber on lap 1. He also passed Kubica's teammate Nick Heidfeld before too long to run sixth. Ralf Schumacher had his Toyota knocked from behind at the first corner, and slipped to the back of the field.

Anthony Davidson, who had qualified strongly, was the first retirement on lap 11, after his Super Aguri suffered a brake failure. He had already dropped down to twentieth position. Adrian Sutil was the next to drop out in the Spyker, also from twentieth, after he spun in the wet conditions on lap 25. Schumacher, recovering from his earlier incident, had made it up to twelfth on lap 22, before he spun twice and eventually retired on lap 26.

As the track dried Hamilton began to suffer from tyre wear. With his pit stop imminent, McLaren elected to keep Hamilton out and stick to the original strategy. This turned out to be a detrimental choice, because by lap 31, Räikkönen had passed Hamilton when the latter ran wide, allowing Räikkönen to take the lead. Hamilton had to come into the pits. This should not have been a problem, however, as he would still have had enough points to secure the World Championship, had he remained in that position. However, as he entered the pit lane with his tyres worn down to the canvas, he failed to negotiate the sharp left-hander into the pits, beaching his car in the gravel. Despite marshal's efforts to get him back into the race, he suffered the first retirement of his career.

An effective strategy from the BMW Sauber team benefited Robert Kubica, who was propelled into the lead after the Hamilton incident. It was short-lived, however, because after one lap, a hydraulics failure deprived him and the BMW Sauber team of a potential first victory each. This left Räikkönen leading from Alonso, who had overtaken Massa in the pitstops, and Jenson Button.

Räikkönen eventually came home to win comfortably from Alonso, who after having pulled out a considerable lead from Massa was later pulled back until the Brazilian finished less than three seconds behind him. Sebastian Vettel of Toro Rosso managed to overtake Button in the closing stages to claim fourth place after he had started seventeenth. His one stop strategy gave him the best result of his career thus far. Button came home fifth, the best result of the season for both him and the Honda team. Liuzzi brought the other Toro Rosso home in sixth place, the team's best result of its career. Nick Heidfeld was seventh in the BMW Sauber, and David Coulthard held on for the final points position in the Red Bull despite late pressure from Heikki Kovalainen's Renault

Alexander Wurz finished twelfth in the Williams, and announced his immediate retirement from Formula One the day after the race. Williams announced that he would be replaced by Kazuki Nakajima for the last race of the season.

Classification

Qualifying

Notes
 – Sebastian Vettel took a five-place grid penalty for impeding another driver.

Race

Championship standings after the race 

Drivers' Championship standings

Constructors' Championship standings

Note: Only the top five positions are included for both sets of standings.
 Bold text indicates competitors who still had a theoretical chance of becoming World Champion.

References

External links

Detailed Chinese Grand Prix results

China
Grand Prix
Chinese Grand Prix
Chinese Grand Prix